Surface House is a historic home located at Christiansburg, Montgomery County, Virginia.  It was built about 1870, and is a one-story, double-pile center passage form frame dwelling on a stone foundation.  It has a hipped roof surrounded by pairs of ornamental brackets in the eaves that also decorate the pedimented four-bay porch.

It was listed on the National Register of Historic Places in 1989.

References

Houses on the National Register of Historic Places in Virginia
Houses completed in 1870
Houses in Montgomery County, Virginia
National Register of Historic Places in Montgomery County, Virginia